was a cargo steamship that was built in Scotland in 1913, served a succession of British owners until 1927, and was then in Japanese ownership until a Royal Navy submarine sank her in 1944.

The ship was built as Ardgorm for a Scottish tramp shipping company. In 1917 a subsidiary of Furness, Withy & Co bought her and renamed her Hartland Point. In 1918 she was transferred to a different Furness, Withy subsidiary and renamed Hartmore. In 1921 the Anglo-Oriental Navigation Company bought her and renamed her Sureway.

In 1927 Japanese owners bought the ship and renamed her Junyo Maru. In 1938 the registered spelling of name became Zyunyo Maru. The name's modern rendition into the Latin alphabet is Jun'yō Maru.

In 1944 Jun'yō Maru was being used as a Hell ship, carrying about 4,200 Javanese slave labourers and about 1,450 Allied prisoners of war (PoWs) when the submarine  sank her. More than 5,000 people were killed. This is one of the highest death tolls of any maritime disaster in World War II, and one of the highest death tolls of any ship sunk by submarine.

Building and first owner
Robert Duncan & Co built the ship at Port Glasgow as yard number 324, launching her on 30 October 1913. She had a single screw, driven by a three-cylinder triple-expansion steam engine built by John G. Kincaid & Company of Greenock that was rated at 475 NHP.

The ship's first managers were Lang & Fulton Ltd, a Scottish firm who operated a small number of tramp steamships, to each of which they gave a name beginning with "Ard–". They named their new ship Ardmore and registered her at Greenock. Her UK official number was 135334 and her code letters were JDPQ.

Changes of owner
In 1917 Furness, Withy bought two ships from Lang & Fulton: Ardglen, which was still being built, and Ardgorm, which Furness, Withy renamed Hartland Point, registered in Liverpool, and allocated to its Norfolk & North American Steamship Company subsidiary. In 1918 Furness, Withy transferred Hartland Point to its Johnston Line subsidiary and renamed her Hartmore. Also by 1919, the ship was equipped for wireless telegraphy.

In 1921 the Anglo-Oriental Navigation Company bought Hartmore, renamed her Sureway, and made Yule, Catto & Co her managers.

In 1927 Sanyo ShaGoshi Kaisha bought the ship, renamed her Junyo Maru, and registered her in Takasago. Her Japanese code letters were THSV. By 1928 Sanyo ShaGoshi Kaisha had sold her on to Kabafuto Kisen KK, who registered her in Tokyo.

By 1934 her call sign was JKLB. In 1938 Baba Shoji KK acquired her, and her registered name became Zyunyo Maru. The name's modern rendition into the Latin alphabet is Jun'yō Maru.

Hell ship
By September 1944 Jun'yō Maru had been fitted out as a prison ship with bamboo scaffolding between her decks and bunks three or four deep in her holds. She had almost no latrines, too little drinking water, only two lifeboats and very few liferafts.

She embarked about 4,200 or 4,300 Javanese forced labourers (rōmushas) and about 1,450 Allied PoWs at the port of Tanjung Priok on Java near Batavia, to take them to Pekanbaru to build a railway across Sumatra. The PoWs included at least 1,382 Dutch, 58 British, eight US and three Australians.

The rōmushas were crammed into holds one and two, forward of the main superstructure amidships. The Allied PoWs were herded into holds three and four, aft of the superstructure. Some prisoners were left on deck. Many were already ill with malnutrition and dysentery before they embarked. Some died, others became delirious.

On 16 September Jun'yō Maru left Tanjung Priok for Sumatra. She traversed the Sunda Strait and passed the island of Krakatoa. On 17 September was heading for Padang, escorted by a small Imperial Japanese Navy ship that survivors described as a corvette or gunboat. By 18 September she had two naval escorts, one on each quarter, which HMS Tradewinds crew described as motor launches.

Sinking

Jun'yō Maru was making a defensive zigzag course, but one of her turns placed her abeam of the submerged Tradewind. Two hit Jun'yō Maru, one in her forward holds and the other aft. One escort vessel retaliated by dropping three depth charges, while the other rescued Japanese survivors. Tradewind dived deep and escaped damage. Jun'yō Maru sank by her stern in about 15 minutes at position .

Jun'yō Marus Japanese crew launched one of her lifeboats, but it was holed and quickly swamped. Its occupants used an axe to repel PoWs in the water who tried to reach the boat. Rōmushas and PoWs in Jun'yō Marus holds had difficulty getting up on deck to abandon ship. The senior British PoW, a Captain Upton, organised PoWs to launch the liferafts and throw overboard any dunnage that might provide buoyancy for survivors in the water. Many rōmushas and PoWs either went down with the ship or drowned as they floated in the ocean.

The next morning, one of the Japanese escort vessels returned and rescued 680 surviving prisoners. They were taken to Pekanbaru, where they were put to work building the railway. One survivor reported that no rōmushas survived, and only 96 Allied PoWs.

See also
List of Japanese hell ships
 and  – German prison ships sunk when transporting between 7,000 and 8,000 deportees.

References

Bibliography

External links

1913 ships
Japanese hell ships
Maritime incidents in September 1944
Merchant ships of Japan
Merchant ships of the United Kingdom
Ships built on the River Clyde
Ships sunk by British submarines
Steamships of Japan
Steamships of the United Kingdom
World War II passenger ships of Japan
World War II shipwrecks in the Pacific Ocean